Magetan Regency is a regency (kabupaten) of East Java Province, Indonesia. It is an inland regency, and lies in the west of the province, adjoining Central Java Province. It covers an area of 668.84 km2 and had a population of 620,442 at the 2010 Census and 670,812 at the 2020 Census. The administrative headquarters is in the town of Magetan.

Magetan has a famous lake called Sarangan Lake which is located in Plaosan District.

The chairman of "Jawa Pos Group", a famous newspaper in Indonesia, Dahlan Iskan, was born here, as were Prof. Dr. Samaun Samadikun (ex-Chief LIPI), Charis Suhud (ex-Vice Chief MPR), Cak Lontong (comedian), and the poet Iman Budhi Santosa. L. J. A. Schoonheyt, the camp doctor at Boven-Digoel concentration camp in the 1930s, was also born here.

Administrative districts 
Magetan Regency consists of eighteen districts (kecamatan), tabulated below with their areas and population totals from the 2010 Census and the 2020 Census. The table also includes the number of administrative villages (rural desa and urban kelurahan) in each district, and its postal codes. 

Notes: (a) except the village of Mojopurno, which has a post code of 63361. (b) except the village of Banjarejo, which has a post code of 63137.

Climate 
Magetan has a tropical climate. Significant rainfall in most of the months of the year, and the short dry season has little effect. This location is classified as Am by Köppen and Geiger. The average annual temperature is 25o C. Within a year the average rainfall is 2045 mm.

Climate

Wind speed

Humidity

Culinary 

Culinary  specialities from Magetan are:
 Tepo tahu
 Getuk pisang, made from banana (from Kauman District)
 Kurmelo, made from orange skin with dates addition
 Lempeng, snack made from dried rice

Notable places
 Mount Lawu
 Cetho Temple
 Sarangan Lake, famous lake in East Java, in Plaosan District
 Tirtosari Waterfall, near Sarangan Lake
 Ngancar Waterfall, in Ngerong District
 Taman Toga (Herbal Medicine Park), in Plaosan District
 Leather Product's Center, at Sawo Street, famous Leather Production in East Java beside Tanggulangin (Sidoarjo)
 Military Airport: Lanud Iswahyudi

References

Book "Apa dan Siapa Magetan", issued by Pemerintah Kabupaten Daerah Tingkat II Magetan, 1987